Defensive democracy is a term referring to the collection of laws, delegated legislation, and court rulings which limit certain rights and freedoms in a democratic society in order to protect the existence of the state, its democratic character and institutions, minority rights, et cetera. The term describes a major conflict that may emerge in a democratic country between compliance with democratic values, particularly freedom of association and the right to be elected, and between preventing anti-democratic groups and persons from abusing these principles.

In certain democratic states there are additional special distinctions, supported by a notable section of the population, which justify the use of defensive democracy. However, the question of in what situations the use of defensive democracy is justified without this being considered excessive repression of civil rights is disputed.

History

The raison d'être for defensive democracy arose due to anti-democratic groups and persons which abused democratic principles and norms. The clearest example of such an abuse is the Nazi Party's takeover by democratic means of the Weimar Republic in 1933, which caused the complete destruction of German democracy, as exemplified by one of Josef Goebbels's infamous addresses:

A prior example was the National Fascist Party's takeover of the Kingdom of Italy in the 1920s, which resulted in an imposition of a dictatorship over Italy.

Methods
The use of defensive democracy can be expressed via several actions applied to a person or group, such as:
 Surveillance by the security corps (especially military and police intelligence) of activists who are considered dangerous, or after entire associations outright;
 Restrictions on the freedom of movement or action over bodies suspected of endangering democracy;
 Deprival of the rights of individuals and parties from running for election (such as Meir Kahane, and subsequently the Kach party which he led, in Israel);
 Outlawing of organizations considered a danger to democracy (such as the Communist Party in West Germany)

As a rule, democratic countries try to not use the methods of defensive democracy too hastily or too severely, and seek alternative courses of action as much as possible, such as public information campaigns and condemnation of anti-democratic activates by respected public figures. However, there are situations where a state might recourse to defensive democratic methods (usually carried out by the court system or other state authorities).

The frequency and extent of use of defensive democratic methods varies from country to country. The United States, for example, is considered a country that uses defensive democratic tactics frequently, especially after the September 11 attacks and the 2021 storming of the United States Capitol, while Italy is considered a country which engages in defensive democratic courses of action sparsely.

Examples

Europe
Ten countries in Europe have outlawed Holocaust denial: France (Loi Gayssot), Belgium (Belgian Holocaust denial law), Switzerland (article 261bis of the Penal Code), Germany (§ 130 (3) of the penal code), Austria (article 3h Verbotsgesetz 1947), Romania, Slovakia, the Czech Republic, Lithuania, and Poland (article 55 of the law creating the Institute of National Remembrance 1998).

Germany 
In German politics the concept exists under the term wehrhafte or streitbare Demokratie ("well-fortified" or "battle-ready democracy") which implies that the federal government (Bundesregierung), the parliament (Bundestag and Bundesrat) and the judiciary are given extensive powers and duties to defend the liberal democratic basic order ("freiheitlich-demokratische Grundordnung") against those who want to abolish it. The idea behind the concept is the notion that even a majority rule of the people cannot be allowed to install a totalitarian or autocratic regime such as with the Enabling Act of 1933, thereby violating the principles of the German constitution, the Basic Law.

Several articles of the German constitution allow a range of different measures to "defend the liberal democratic order".

 Art. 9 allows for social groups to be labelled  ("hostile to the constitution") and to be proscribed by the federal government.
, that has never happened in the history of the Federal Republic.
 The federal and state bureaucracies can exclude people deemed "hostile to the constitution" from the civil service according to Art. 33. Every civil servant (a very broad class including many in the public sector who would not be considered civil servants in other countries, such as teachers) is sworn to defend the constitution and the constitutional order.
 According to Art. 20, every German citizen has the right to resistance against anyone who wants to abolish the constitutional order as a last resort.

In addition, Germany maintains a domestic intelligence service, the Verfassungsschutz, whose main purpose is to investigate parties which may violate the constitutional bans on working to end the democratic nature of the state (in particular far-right and Communist parties).

Israel
Israel implemented the principle of defensive democracy, the Basic Law of the Knesset (Section 7A) which determined that "candidate lists would not participate in elections if its goals or actions, expressly or by implication, would deny the existence of the state of Israel as a Jewish state or deny the democratic character of the state of Israel."

Various political science researchers have perceived Israel as a democracy defending itself mainly from social and security constraints with which the state of Israel has been dealing since its creation. During the first three decades of its existence, most Arab countries did not recognize the state of Israel's existence as legitimate. Through the years, concerns have been raised from within the Jewish majority in Israel that the Arab minority within the country, who consider themselves part of the Arab world, would cooperate with the neighboring countries in their struggle against Israel. This situation has often raised the issue of a self-defensive democracy on the agenda in Israel.

During the 1980s, the issue was heavily discussed in a different context – for the first time in Israel's history, an extreme right-wing Jewish party (Kach), who rejected the state's democratic character and the rights of the Arab minority within the country, won representation to the Israeli parliament in the 1984 elections to the Knesset. As a result, Israel's Supreme Court outlawed the party and did not allow it to run again in the 1988 elections on the basis that the party advocates racism.

Republic of Korea (South Korea)
Learning from legislation of West Germany, National Assembly of Second Republic inserted Defensive Democracy in their Constitution in 1960. Currently (as of 2022) in the Sixth Republic, it remains in the Constitution (§8(4) — esp. defensive democracy to prevent illegal parties) and has some procedures in other laws. The Constitutional Court of Korea is in charge of deciding if a party is illegal and therefore should be dissolved.

For the first time since the Constitutional Court of Korea was created, in November 2013, the Justice Ministry of Korea petitioned the Constitutional Court to dissolve the Unified Progressive Party, citing its pro-North Korean activities such as the 2013 South Korean sabotage plot. On 19 December 2014, the Court ruled 8-1 that the Unified Progressive Party be dissolved. This ruling was quite controversial in South Korea.

Republic of China (Taiwan) 
Article 5 of the Additional Articles of the Constitution of the Republic of China clearly states that any political party whose purpose or behaviour threatens the existence of the Republic of China or constitutional order of liberal democracy is unconstitutional, and the Constitutional Court can dissolve it.

See also
Communist Party of Germany v. the Federal Republic of Germany
Eternity clause in Germany
National security
Paradox of tolerance
Socialist Reich Party

References

Literature
Andras Sajo. From militant democracy to the preventive state?  Constitutional Law Review No. 1
Rory O'Connell Militant Democracy and Human Rights Principles Constitutional Law Review No. 1

Types of democracy